Hellinsia albidactylus is a moth of the family Pterophoridae that is known from Japan (Honshu), Korea, China and Russia.

The larvae feed on Asteraceae species.

References

External links
Taxonomic and Biological Studies of Pterophoridae of Japan (Lepidoptera)
Japanese Moths

albidactylus
Moths of Asia
Moths described in 1963